Zelmeņi is a village in Tērvete Parish, Dobele Municipality in the Semigallia region of Latvia.

Towns and villages in Latvia
Dobele Municipality
Semigallia